Lemsford Road Halt was a railway station on the St Albans Branch of the Great Northern Railway. The platforms are still visible next to the line of the old track, which has been converted to a cycle route and footpath, the Alban Way. The site of the station is located at 
The station was built for the workers of the nearby de Havilland Aircraft factory. This station did not appear on railway time tables or maps during hostilities.

References

Former London and North Eastern Railway stations
Railway stations in Great Britain opened in 1942
Railway stations in Great Britain closed in 1951
Former private railway stations
Disused railway stations in Hertfordshire
1942 establishments in England